Denis Naegelen (born 14 March 1952) is a former professional tennis player from France.

Career
Naegelen competed in the French Open every year from 1973 to 1983, with the exception of 1979. He had his best singles performance at the 1980 French Open, where he beat Jiri Hrebec and Terry Rocavert. In third round he wasted a two set lead to lose to American Ferdi Taygan, 9–11 in the fifth. He also took part in the 1973 Australian Open and made the second round of both the singles and doubles.

In 1976, Naegelen was a quarter-finalist at a Grand Prix tournament in Madrid.

He and Patrice Dominguez were doubles champions at the 1979 Bordeaux Open.

Grand Prix career finals

Doubles: 1 (1–0)

References

1952 births
Living people
French male tennis players